Donald Blair Melrose  (born 13 September 1940) is an Australian astrophysicist, Director of the Special Research Centre in Astrophysics and Professor of Physics (theoretical) at the University of Sydney.

Melrose was born in Hobart, Tasmania. He was educated at North Sydney Boys High School. He commenced undergraduate studies at the University of Western Australia in 1958, then studied at the University of Tasmania 1959 to 1961 where he graduated Bachelor of Science with Honours.
In 1962, Melrose was awarded a Rhodes Scholarship and studied at Oxford University, UK, where he completed a Doctor of Philosophy (DPhil) in 1965. From 1965 to 1966, Melrose was Research Fellow in Physics at the University of Sussex, UK.
From 1966 to 1968, Melrose was Research Associate in Physics at Belfer Graduate School of Sciences, Yeshiva University, New York City, USA, then Research Fellow in the Department of Physics and Astronomy at the University of Maryland, USA, 1968 - 1969.

Moving back to Australia, Melrose was Reader in Theoretical Physics at Australian National University, 1969 to 1978. In 1979 he was appointed Professor of (theoretical) Physics at the University of Sydney. From 1979 to 1984, Melrose was member then Chairman (from 1980) of the National Committee for Astronomy of Australia.

In 1986, Melrose was awarded the Walter Boas Medal by the Australian Institute of Physics and the Pawsey Medal by the Australian Academy of Science.
Melrose became inaugural Chairman of the Sydney Association for Astrophysics 1985 to 1988.
In 1990, he became Honorary Research Fellow at the Australia Telescope National Facility.

References

1940 births
Living people
Australian physicists
University of Western Australia alumni
Alumni of the University of Oxford
Academic staff of the University of Sydney
Australian Rhodes Scholars
People educated at North Sydney Boys High School